Palkino is a rural locality (a village) in Gorod Vyazniki, Vyaznikovsky District, Vladimir Oblast, Russia. The population was 164 as of 2010.

Geography 
Palkino is located 13 km north of Vyazniki (the district's administrative centre) by road. Kozlovo is the nearest rural locality.

References 

Rural localities in Vyaznikovsky District